Braco Airfield  is a coastal airstrip between Rio Bueno and Duncans in the Trelawny Parish of Jamaica.

There are low hills west of the runway. East approach and departure may be over the water.

See also

Transport in Jamaica
List of airports in Jamaica

References

External links
OpenStreetMap - Braco Airfield
Bing Maps - Braco Airfield
FallingRain - Braco

Airports in Jamaica